Kampong Batang Mitus is a village in Tutong District, Brunei, about  from the district town Pekan Tutong. The population was 708 in 2016. It is one of the villages within Mukim Kiudang, a mukim subdivision in the district.

Facilities 
The village primary school is Batang Mitus Primary School. It also shares grounds with Batang Mitus Religious School, the village school for the country's Islamic religious primary education.

References 

Batang Mitus